Softly was an LP album featuring The Sandpipers, released by A&M Records in August, 1968. The album reached #180 on the Billboard chart. Two singles from the album  charted in the top 40 on the Billboard Adult Contemporary chart: "Quando M'Innamoro" at #16 and the title track at #39.

The album was the first Sandpipers album to be issued in stereo only and not in monaural form in the United States; the catalog numbers were SP-4147 in the US and Canada, and AML-918 in the United Kingdom.  Other international releases included Australia (A&M SAML-932,987 and World Record Club R03855), Brazil (A&M SP 4194), Germany (A&M 212 043), Israel (A&M 212043), New Zealand (A&M SAML-932987), Spain (A&M HDAS 371-22), Taiwan (Thia Sun KHS-4199), and Venezuela (A&M LPS 77326).

Track listing

Side One
Softly (Gordon Lightfoot) 2:30
Find a Reason to Believe (Tim Hardin) 2:04
Back on the Street Again (Steve Gillette) 1:55
Love Is Blue (L’Amour Est Bleu) (Brian Blackburn/André Popp/Pierre Cour) 1:55
Canción De Amor (Wanderlove) (Mason Williams/C. Mapel) 3:45
Quando M'Innamoro (Roberto Livraghi/Daniele Pace/Mario Panzeri) 3:05

Side Two
Jennifer Juniper  (Donovan Leitch) 2:40
All My Loving (Lennon–McCartney)
Ojos De España (Spanish Eyes) (Bert Kaempfert/Eddie Snyder/Charlie Singleton)
To Put Up With You (Paul Williams/Roger Nichols) 2:45
Suzanne (Leonard Cohen) 4:35
Gloria Patri (Gregorian Psalm Tone III) 0:21

The 8-track tape release (AM 8147) had a different track order: A1-A3-A5, A2-A4-B3, A6-B1-B2, B4-B5-B6.

Production
Producer: Tommy LiPuma
Arrangers: Bob Thompson, Nick DeCaro
Recording Engineer: Henry Lewy
Mixing Engineer: Dick Bogert
Album Design: Corporate Head
Art Director: Tom Wilkes
Photography: Guy Webster

References

The Sandpipers albums
1968 albums
Albums produced by Tommy LiPuma
A&M Records albums